Moksha is a 2013 Telugu-language horror film which is loosely based on Hollywood movie Let Me In (2010) and directed by Srikanth Vemulapalli, who has earlier directed a very critically acclaimed movie Black and White (2008). The film stars actress Meera Jasmine in lead role. The movie was produced by P. Amarnatha Reddy under the banner of Amarnathan Movies and released on 28 June 2013.

Meera is seen in an entirely different get up in the film. The film is female oriented and Meera is playing a strong character in the film. Rajeev Mohan and Disha Pandey played significant roles in the film. Nassar, Rahul Dev and Sana played supporting roles in the film. The film's shooting started in November 2009  and was held in Ramoji Film City, Hyderabad and Chennai. The subject matter of the film was said to be entirely new and never done before on Indian screen.

Plot 
Sreenu is basically frightened college student. Like other such kind of movies, everyone in the college tease and starts hitting Sreenu but other heroine Disha Pandey who plays role of second heroine Nisha loves Sreenu. But Sreenu does not like her much. In the meantime, Moksha our lead heroine Meera Jasmine comes into picture.

Moksha and her father shifted to the city and whose residence is next to the Sreenu's house. As Moksha attitude is totally different like she will not come out of the home in the morning and will be out in the nights itself. One fine night Sreenu met Moksha. By that time some murders already take place in their area.

One night Sreenu's classmates see him sitting with Moksha and invite them to the "Valentine's day" party. At the party, Sreenu's classmates get him drunk and try to rape Moksha, however the friend who tries to rape Moksha dies in a horrendous manner.

Moksha's father warns her not to go out with Sreenu else they would have to move away from this house too. Moksha silently listens to him.

Nisha approaches a tantrik hoping to learn a trick or two to attract Sreenu. However the Tantrik tells her that her dreams cannot be realised.

Cast
 Meera Jasmine as Moksha
 Rajeev Mohan as Srinu
 Disha Pandey
 Nassar as Moksha's father
 Rahul Dev
 Sana

References

Indian remakes of American films
2010s Telugu-language films
2013 films
2013 horror films
Indian horror films